Bay Currents, founded by an entrepreneurial journalist in August 2004,  is an independent newspaper focusing on oceanfront Brooklyn, New York, United States, including Sheepshead Bay, Brighton Beach, and Coney Island. The newspaper is published bi-weekly by Brooklyn Media. It has a readership of about 30,000.

Bay Currents has run a campaign to keep Wal-Mart from opening a store in the borough of Brooklyn, among other enterprising stories. It is also known for its coverage of the District 47 Assembly  election placing the first Russian-American in state office.

Exclusive stories 
Bay Currents is known for its coverage of many pressing issues facing the oceanfront community. It has covered the personal use of cell phones by drivers of the popular Access-A-Rise van service while transporting their passengers. Bay Currents was the first to reveal that a local radiology clinic suddenly closed down and left hundreds of patients without the means to retrieve the results of their exams.

Special sections 
Book Currents - Reviews of contemporary literature as well as classics that have modern relevance.
Senior Currents - Focuses on the concerns of Brooklyn's elders.
Financial Currents - Covers news in the financial world.

References

External links
 Official Site

Newspapers published in Brooklyn
Newspapers established in 2004
2004 establishments in New York City